Demirciören can refer to:

 Demirciören, Kızılcahamam
 Demirciören, Kurşunlu